James H. Bowen High School (known simply as Bowen High School) is a public 4–year high school located in the South Chicago neighborhood on the south side of Chicago, Illinois, United States. Bowen is operated by the Chicago Public Schools district.

From 1993 until 2011, Bowen was divided into four smaller schools. Today, the smaller schools have been re-consolidated back into one school.

History
 Bowen High School was established in 1882, under the name South Chicago High School in one of the classrooms of the Bowen Elementary School (demolished), which was located at the northwest corner of 93rd Street and Houston Avenue in the then-independent community of South Chicago. Fourteen pupils were given high school-level instruction.  The elementary school and its successor high school were named for Colonel James H. Bowen (1822-1881), the first president of the Calumet and Chicago Canal Dock Company and the man known as "the father of South Chicago".

The two schools became separate institutions in 1910, when the current building was constructed at the northeast corner of Marquette and 89th Street. It was designed by Dwight Perkins (1867–1941), supervising architect of the Chicago Public School system between 1905 and 1910, and built "on identical plans" as its more famous cousin, Irving Park High School. (opened as Carl Schurz High School  The latter building is listed on the National Register of Historic Places.  The building cost $700,000 and contained about 125 rooms; it was noted for its manual training and domestic science departments. By the 1930s, Bowen's student body had grown to 4,600, due to the great increase in immigrants of Polish and Slavic descent in the South Chicago area.

Athletics 
Bowen competes in the Chicago Public League (CPL) and is a member of the Illinois High School Association (IHSA).  Bowen sport teams are called the Boilermakers. The boys' baseball team were Public League champions in the 1953–54 and the 1971 season.  The boys' soccer team were Public League champions three times (1979–80, 1980–81 and 1981–82). the boys' football team were Blue Division champs in 1963 defeating Harlan 19-18. After taking a 13-0 lead at half time Bowen came back in the last two minutes of the game to win it on a pass from George Lalich to Steve Zinini. Steve served as a gunner on a chopper in Vietnam.  The team got the ball back because of a fumble recovery by Jim Robinson who served as a marine in Vietnam. Those three were the heroes of the game. They were Blue Division Champs back to back in 1981, 1982 and 1983 defeating Harlan each time. The following year they moved up to The Red Division.

Notable alumni
Jon Burge, Chicago Police Department officer, convicted of torturing over 200 men into giving false confessions. Served 4 years.
Phil Collins – former MLB player (Chicago Cubs, Philadelphia Phillies, St. Louis Cardinals)
Andrew Davis –  film director.
Johnny Drake - football player
Eli Grba – former baseball player who pitched in the 1960 World Series as a member of the New York Yankees.
Bill Haarlow – early professional basketball player.
Roy Henshaw - former big-league left-handed pitcher who went 33-40 in parts of eight seasons (1933, 1935-1938, 1942-1944) in the majors, most notably with the "Chicago Cubs".
Billy Holm –  former MLB player (Chicago Cubs, Boston Red Sox).
Joni James – MGM Records star who sold more than 100 million singles and albums worldwide beginning in 1952, four years after graduating from Bowen.
Gene Krupa – drummer.
 Edward M. Lerner – science fiction author and technologist.
 Samuel C. Maragos, member of the Illinois General Assembly.
Kenneth Mars - actor (The Producers, Malcolm in the Middle)
Tony Piet – baseball player for the Chicago White Sox
Earl W. Renfroe - orthodontist
Ed Schwartz –radio host who worked at WIND, WGN, and WLUP in Chicago.
Marc Smith – creator of slam poetry.
Ed Winceniak – former MLB player (Chicago Cubs).

References

External links
Facebook: Bowen High School
Official Bowen High School Alumni Association Inc. 
Bowen High School Website

Public high schools in Chicago
Educational institutions established in 1900
1900 establishments in Illinois